The  are a Nippon Professional Baseball team formed as a result of the 2004 Nippon Professional Baseball realignment by the merger of the Orix BlueWave of Kobe, Hyōgo Prefecture, Japan, and the Osaka Kintetsu Buffaloes of Osaka, Osaka Prefecture, Japan. The team plays in the Pacific League and is under ownership by Orix, a leading diversified financial services company founded in Osaka.

The combined team began play in 2005. The Buffaloes split home games between Kyocera Dome Osaka, which was the home of the original Buffaloes franchise, and Kobe Sports Park Baseball Stadium, the former home of the BlueWave, when the Hanshin Tigers take over Kyocera Dome for when they are kicked out of Hanshin Koshien Stadium during the Japanese High School Baseball Championship in the month of August.

Franchise history

Hankyu/Orix (1936–2004)

Hankyu Braves
Later nicknamed the Hankyu Braves, it was one of the first professional baseball teams in Japan, and the oldest surviving team in the Pacific League.

In the early 1950s, the franchise made a dedicated effort to attract foreign talent, particularly African-American veterans of Negro league baseball, including infielders John Britton and Larry Raines, and pitchers Jimmy Newberry and Rufus Gaines. These players were the first Americans other than Wally Yonamine to play Nippon Professional Baseball after World War II.

Starting in the mid-1960s, the Braves became one of the dominant teams not only in the Pacific League but in all of Japanese professional baseball. Between 1967 and 1972, the Hankyu Braves won the Pacific League pennant five times but lost the Japan Series each time against the Yomiuri Giants. Manager Yukio Nishimoto was known as "the great manager in tragedy" because of those losses. But the Hankyu Braves won Japan Series three times in a row from 1975, against the Tokyo Giants in 1976 and 1977, led by manager Toshiharu Ueda. At that time, many good players in Japanese baseball history played for the Hankyu Braves, including pitcher Hisashi Yamada and outfielder Yutaka Fukumoto.

In the 1980s, the team still was a strong contender in the Pacific League, but lost the PL pennant to the Seibu Lions every year except 1984; that year, the Braves fell to the Hiroshima Toyo Carp in the Japan Series in seven games.

On October 19, 1988, Hankyu Railway sold the franchise to the lease company Orient Lease (since 1989 known as Orix Group), in what was known as "the longest day of the Pacific League". The reason is that when the franchise sale occurred, the Kintetsu Buffaloes played the legendary "10.19" double-header for the Pacific League pennant, only to miss the pennant out because of the second game ending in a tie. For Kintetsu to win the pennant, they had to win both games in the doubleheader against the Lotte Orions. The sale was a surprise, at that time, it was much rarer for a Japanese professional baseball team to change owners, not to mention for a large company to sell one of its parts. In that case, Hankyu Railway was thought of as one of the big companies that would never need to do such a thing.

The sale was not without two assurances: the team name would remain "Braves," and the franchise would stay in Nishinomiya. During the first two years of new ownership, the team was known as the Orix Braves and played in Nishinomiya.

BlueWave
In 1991, the team moved to Kobe and became the Orix BlueWave. Orix put out a poll to decide the new name, and unsurprisingly, people voted Braves. It was said that Orix put out another poll and told fans "Braves" was not allowed. What made it worse was in that second poll, "Thunder" was the winning name, which fit the new color scheme (when Orix bought the team, they changed their colors from black and red to navy blue and gold). But, Orix went with "BlueWave". Longtime fans were shocked by these changes. One member of the Braves ouendan was reported to say that "the race was decided before the gun even went off". Another thing that did not make sense to fans was they were named BlueWave while playing in then-named Green Stadium (now Hotto Motto Field or Kobe Sports Park) in a city whose official color is green. However, since Nishinomiya and Kobe are close to one another, and the new home field of the team was better than the old one, most fans accepted the move, although with some nostalgia for the historic "Braves" name. The team was sometimes called  by fans and the baseball media, which means "blue wave" in Japanese.

Led by Ichiro Suzuki in 1995 and 1996, the Orix BlueWave won the Pacific League pennant. In 1996, they also won the Japan Series. In 2001, Ichiro moved to the Seattle Mariners and lead the Mariners to a 116 win season, the most wins by an American League team.

Orix Buffaloes (2005 to present)
Following the 2004 Nippon Professional Baseball realignment, the BlueWave merged with the Osaka Kintetsu Buffaloes. The team struggled since its merger, only finishing in the top half (or A Class) of the Pacific league once from 2005 to 2013. In 2008, The Buffaloes finished 2nd in the Pacific League, going 75-68-1 and finishing 2 1/2 games behind the Saitama Seibu Lions, but were swept by the Hokkaido Nippon Ham Fighters at home in the 1st stage of the Climax Series. After 2 seasons of finishing last in the Pacific League, they finished first in 2021, going 70-55-18. They swept the Chiba Lotte Marines in the final stage of the Climax Series to make their first Japan Series appearance since 1996. Ultimately, they were defeated by the Tokyo Yakult Swallows in six games. In 2022, despite a rough start to the season, the Buffaloes finished 1st after a 5-2 win over the Tohoku Rakuten Golden Eagles on the final day of the Pacific League regular season, combined with the Fukuoka SoftBank Hawks losing to the Marines, 5-2, at the same time the game was happening, and also because they had 5 more wins against the Hawks during the regular season, 15-10. The Buffaloes would defeat the Fukuoka Softbank Hawks in the Final Stage of the 2022 Pacific League Climax Series, 4 games to 1, which set up a rematch of the previous year's Japan Series, but this time the Buffaloes would exact revenge on the Swallows, defeating them 4 games to 2.

Current roster

Baseball Hall of Famers
Elected mainly for Hankyu Braves service
Yutaka Fukumoto, CF, 1969–1988 (inducted 2002)
Takao Kajimoto, P, 1954–1973 (inducted 2007)
Hisashi Yamada, P, 1969–1988 (inducted 2006)
Tetsuya Yoneda, P, 1956–1975 (inducted 2000)

Elected for service with other teams, as well as Hankyu and Orix
Hiromitsu Kadota, DH, 1989–1990 (inducted 2006)
Futoshi Nakanishi, Head coach / Hitting coach, 1985–1990†, 1995–1997 (inducted 1999) †For Kintetsu Buffaloes
Akira Ōgi, MGR 1988–1992†, 1994–2001, 2005 (inducted 2004)
Toshiharu Ueda, MGR, 1974–1978, 1981–1990 (inducted 2003)

Elected mainly for Kintetsu Buffaloes service
Yukio Nishimoto, MGR 1974–1981 (inducted 1988)
Keishi Suzuki, P, 1966–1985 (inducted 2002)

Notable former players and managers
as Orix Buffaloes
 
 
  (清原 和博) – 1B/3B
 
 
  – 1B 
 
  
 
 
 
  
 

as Orix BlueWave
  
  (also known as D.J)
 
  
 
  – formerly of the Anaheim Angels and Seattle Mariners
  
 
  
 
  
  
  
 
  – of the Seattle Mariners and New York Yankees of MLB's American League
 

as Kintetsu (and Osaka Kintetsu) Buffaloes
 
  
 
  
 
 
 

as Hankyu (and Orix) Braves
  – underhanded big-game pitcher who defeated the Yomiuri Giants
 
  – once pitched a perfect game
 
 
 
 
   
 
  - steal the most bases in NPB up to now
  
  
 
  
  
 
  (the first non-Japanese triple crown hitter in NPB history)

MLB players
Active:
Masataka Yoshida (beginning 2023)
Jacob Waguespack (beginning 2021) 
Frank Schwindel (beginning 2023)

Former:
Adam Jones (2020–2021) 
Mac Suzuki (2003–2005)
Joey Butler (2014)
Hideo Nomo (1990–1994)
Shigetoshi Hasegawa (1990–1996)
Masao Kida (1998,2000–2001)
So Taguchi (1992–2001,2010–2011)
Koo Dae-Sung (2001–2004)
Tuffy Rhodes (2007-2009)
Joey Meneses (2018–2019)
Ichiro Suzuki (1992–2000) 
Yoshihisa Hirano (2018-2020)
Brandon Dickson (2013–2021)
Masato Yoshii (1997–2002)

Managers

 Statistics current through the end of the  season.

Theme Song 
The Buffaloes' current theme song is Sky by Japanese band Mega Stopper. The song was first used in 2005. Another version that is used is sung by the club's cheerleading squad, BsGirls.

Mascots
1981 until 1990
Bravey (ブレービー) #100, a large bird
Yuta (勇太) #101, a younger bird
Braves Boy (ブレーブス坊や), a baseball headed warrior

1991 until 2010
Neppie (ネッピー) #111, a young boy
Ripsea (リプシー) #222, a young girl

since 2011
Buffalo Bull (バッファローブル) #111, a male hybrid of oryx and buffalo, Bell's brother
Buffalo Bell (バッファローベル) #222, a female hybrid of oryx and buffalo, Bull's sister

References

External links
 

 
Baseball teams established in 1936
Nippon Professional Baseball teams
Sports teams in Kobe
Sports teams in Osaka
1936 establishments in Japan